Rassylnaya is a rural locality in Voroshnevsky Selsoviet Rural Settlement, Kursky District, Kursk Oblast, Russia. Population:

Geography 
The village is located on the Seym River (a left tributary of the Desna), 78 km from the Russia–Ukraine border, 12 km south-west of Kursk, at the western border of the selsoviet center – Voroshnevo.

 Streets
There are the following streets in the locality: Lugovaya, Molodyozhnaya, Novaya, Sovkhoznaya, Tsentralnaya, Yubileynaya and Yasnaya (294 houses).

 Climate
Rassylnaya has a warm-summer humid continental climate (Dfb in the Köppen climate classification).

Transport 
Rassylnaya is located 3 km from the federal route  Crimea Highway (a part of the European route ), on the road of regional importance  (Kursk – Lgov – Rylsk – border with Ukraine), 5 km from the nearest railway station Dyakonovo (railway line Lgov I — Kursk).

The rural locality is situated 21 km from Kursk Vostochny Airport, 117 km from Belgorod International Airport and 222 km from Voronezh Peter the Great Airport.

References

Notes

Sources

Rural localities in Kursky District, Kursk Oblast